The 1872 Missouri gubernatorial election was held on November 5, 1872 and resulted in a victory for the Democratic nominee, Silas Woodson, over the Republican candidate, former Senator John B. Henderson.

Results

References

Missouri
1872
Gubernatorial
Missouri gubernatorial election